Chapora is a Goan placename that can mean:

 Chapora River, a river in Northern Goa, India
Chapora Fort, a fort on the banks of the Chapora river
Chapora Beach, a beach and village near the fort.